Seabra is a Portuguese surname. Notable people with the surname include:

Antero Frederico de Seabra (1874–1952), Portuguese naturalist
António Luís de Seabra, 1st Viscount of Seabra (1798–1895), Portuguese magistrate and politician
Antônio Luiz Seabra, Brazilian billionaire businessman
Augusto M. Seabra, Portuguese film critic
Jose Luiz Seabra (born 1974), Brazilian-born Trinidad and Tobago football defender
Manuel de Seabra (1932–2017), Portuguese writer, journalist, translator
Maria do Carmo Seabra (born 1955), Portuguese politician
Renato Seabra (born 1978), Brazilian cyclist
Roberto Seabra (born 1976), Brazilian water polo player
Ruy Seabra (born 1947), Portuguese lawyer and football manager
Daniel R. Seabra (born 1981), Portuguese Comedian
Vasco Seabra (born 1983), Portuguese football manager
Veríssimo Correia Seabra (1947–2004), Guinea-Bissau general
Zita Seabra (born 1949), Portuguese politician

Portuguese-language surnames